José Palhares Costa (22 February 1908 – 13 November 1976) was a Portuguese hurdler. He competed in the men's 110 metres hurdles at the 1928 Summer Olympics.

References

External links
 

1908 births
1976 deaths
Athletes (track and field) at the 1928 Summer Olympics
Portuguese male hurdlers
Olympic athletes of Portugal
Athletes from Lisbon